The discography of Chelsea Light Moving, an American alternative rock band from New York formed in 2012, consists of one studio album, three singles and one music video.

Chelsea Light Moving's membership includes Thurston Moore (vocals, guitar), Keith Wood (guitar), Samara Lubelski (bass) and John Moloney (drums). Formed following the announcement of the indefinite hiatus of Sonic Youth, Moore's former band, Chelsea Light Moving released three singles—"Burroughs", "Groovy & Linda" and "Frank O'Hara Hit"—in a series of blog posts on Matador Records' official site over summer 2012. In 2013, the band's eponymous debut album was released to critical acclaim and upon its release, charted in both of Belgium's Ultratop albums charts in Flanders and Wallonia. The album also debuted on the United States' Billboard Heatseekers Albums chart at number 12.

Albums

Studio albums

Singles

Music videos

References

External links

Alternative rock discographies
Discographies of American artists